Sergius I (died 966) was the second Duke of Amalfi and first of the Musco Comite family.

In 958, Sergius, a citizen of the city of Amalfi, assassinated the first duke, Mastalus II and usurped the throne. In order to establish a ducal dynasty as in Naples and Gaeta, he immediately associated his son Manso I with him in his office. When he died, Manso's succession was smooth.

Sergius had other sons named John, Adhemar, and Leo, as well as a son named Adelfer, who later also usurped rule in Amalfi.

External links
Medieval Lands Project: Southern Italy.

966 deaths
Sergius
10th-century Italian nobility
10th-century rulers in Europe
Year of birth unknown